The Observant Man Panel, also known as The Hidden Images Panel, is a panel of Barrier Canyon Style pictographs along the Swallow Nest Creek in Utah, United States.

History
Evidence of the Archaic appeared around 6000 BC in and near Emery County.

The archaic work is frequently known as Barrier Canyon style or BCS for short. Their figures frequently depicted owl like figures often ghostly like and they rarely had arms.

Tools Used
The Archaic - Used a series of tools to make these pictographs often a brush made of yucca or animal fibers. The paint often was made with Indian paintbrush and urine or animal blood.

References

Exploring Rock Art

Rock art in North America
Geography of Emery County, Utah
Petroglyphs in Utah